Ray Wehba (August 16, 1916 – June 2, 2003) was a player in the National Football League. He first played with the Brooklyn Dodgers during the 1943 NFL season before playing with the Green Bay Packers during the 1944 NFL season.

References

External links

1916 births
2003 deaths
People from Sherman, Texas
Players of American football from Texas
American football ends
Brooklyn Dodgers (NFL) players
Green Bay Packers players
USC Trojans football players